André Diot (born 1935) is a cinematographer and lighting designer of French theatre and film, who played an important role in the emergence of the profession in France. In a long career, he designed the lighting for the 1976 Bayreuth Jahrhundertring, staged by Patrice Chéreau, the opening and closing ceremony of the 1992 Winter Olympics in Albertville, and in 2013 Così fan tutte at the Paris Opera.

Career 

While a director of photography in television, Diot was introduced by Bernard Sobel to Patrice Chéreau, with whom he subsequently worked extensively. Their first joint creation was in 1967, for Les Soldats by Jakob Michael Reinhold Lenz. Diot then introduced Hydrargyrum medium-arc iodide lamp (HMI) theater projectors, usually reserved for the cinema or sports events. Until the mid-1980s, he used techniques such as black-and-white, backlighting and shadows to create an onstage environment of chiaroscuro, or of twilight, a poetic atmosphere that eventually became their joint trademark: Diot-Chéreau.

They worked together in Chéreau's first theatre, the Théâtre de Sartrouville, from 1966, in a team with together with stage designer Richard Peduzzi and costume designer Jacques Schmidt.

As part of this team, he designed the lighting for the Jahrhundertring (Centenary Ring), the production of Richard Wagner's Ring Cycle, Der Ring des Nibelungen, at the Bayreuth Festival celebrating the centenary of the festival and the cycle.

He designed the lighting for Peter Zadek's 1988 staging of Shakespeare's Der Kaufmann von Venedig at the Burgtheater, which took the action to a Wall Street background. In 2013 he designed the lighting for Mozart's Così fan tutte at the Paris Opera, staged by Ezio Toffolutti and conducted by Michael Schønwandt.

Awards 

He was nominated in 2007 for Blanc by Emmanuelle Marie, staged again by Breitman.

Filmography

Selected theatre productions 

 1967: Les Soldats by Jakob Lenz, staged by Patrice Chéreau
 1973: La Dispute by Marivaux, staged by Chéreau
 1979: No Man's Land by Harold Pinter, staged by Roger Planchon at the Théâtre national populaire at Villeurbanne (French premiere)
 1986: , written and staged by 
 1998:
 , staged by Benno Besson
 2001: Le cercle de craie caucasien by Bertolt Brecht, staged by Besson
 2004:  by Roland Topor, staged by Zabou Breitman at the Théâtre de l'Atelier
 2005: Célébration by Pinter, staged by Planchon at the Théâtre du Rond-Point
 2006: Le Roi Lear by Shakespeare, staged by Engel
 2009: Minetti (de) de Thomas Bernhard, staged by Engel at the 

Selected film productions 

 1973: L'École des femmes, telefilm by Raymond Rouleau
 1975: Lily aime-moi by Maurice Dugowson
 1976:
 F... comme Fairbanks by Dugowson
  by Jean-François Adam
 1985:  by 
 1986:
  by Michel Deville
 Le Passage (fr) by 
 1987:  by Vergez
 1989: La Folle Journée ou Le Mariage de Figaro de Roger Coggio
 1997:  by Deville
 1999: La Maladie de Sachs (fr) by Deville

 References 

 External links 
 André Diot, Les Archives du Spectacle 
 Film News / Patrice Chéreau, World Renowned French Director, Dies in Paris The Journalist'' 8 October 2013

Lighting designers
French cinematographers
1935 births
Living people